The Cathedral College is an independent Catholic systemic secondary day and boarding school for boys and girls, located in Rockhampton, Queensland, Australia. It was founded in 1991 as a Catholic co-educational college for students in Year 8 to Year 12, and included Year 7 students as of 2015.

Prior to the establishment of the college, the Sisters of Mercy's Range College for girls and St Joseph's Christian Brothers' College for boys offered Catholic secondary education for the families of Central Queensland for nearly one hundred years until they were amalgamated to form The Cathedral College, located on the former St Joseph's College site.

The school is administered by the Diocese of Rockhampton.

As of 2021, the current principal of The Cathedral College is Rob Alexander.

Notable alumni
 Kobe Hetherington - NRL Player
 Emmanita Paki - NRLW Player
 Dan Russell - PNG Rugby league international

See also

 Catholic education in Australia
 Lists of schools in Queensland
 The Range Convent and High School

References

Educational institutions established in 1991
Catholic secondary schools in Queensland
Former Congregation of Christian Brothers schools in Australia
Catholic boarding schools in Australia
1991 establishments in Australia
Buildings and structures in Rockhampton
Roman Catholic Diocese of Rockhampton